Sakti Burman (also spelled Shakti, Shakthi and Sakthi [born 1935 in Calcutta]) is a contemporary Indian artist of Indian parentage living in France.

He grew up in what is now Bangladesh, British India. He has lived in France for the last five decades, while maintaining strong ties with India, where he regularly exhibits his works. He is married to French painter Maite Delteil. His extended family includes several eminent artists: his daughter, Maya Burman also lives and works in France; his niece, Jayasri Burman was inspired by him and is a notable artist in her own right; as is his niece's husband, Paresh Maity. He has had several exhibitions of his work in India, and elsewhere, and won several prizes.

A painter and lithographer, Burman's art has mythic and fantasy content and rich colors.

References

External links
Paintings at the website of Glenbarra Art Museum
Website with brief biography and some images of his pictures
 

"Sakti Burman Profile,Interview and Artworks"

Artists from Kolkata
20th-century Indian painters
Living people
1935 births
Bengali male artists
French people of Indian descent
French Hindus
Indian male painters
20th-century Indian male artists